The 1911–12 Illinois Fighting Illini men's basketball team represented the University of Illinois.

Regular season
The 1911–12 season was Thomas E. Thompson's second year as head coach of the Illinois Fighting Illini men's basketball team.  Under Thompson's guidance the Illini experienced a perfect non-conference season while at the same time having a less than perfect conference record.  Overall the team played to an eight win, eight loss record, however; all of the season's losses were within Western Conference play.  During conference play the team won six times and placed fifth overall.  The starting lineup for the team included; Albert L. Hall, Homer W. Dahringer and R. P. Gates as forwards, H. T. Leo as the center,
with James G. White and captain William H. Woolston at the guard positions.

Roster

Source

Schedule
												
Source																

|-	
!colspan=12 style="background:#DF4E38; color:white;"| Non-Conference regular season
|- align="center" bgcolor=""

			

|-	
!colspan=9 style="background:#DF4E38; color:#FFFFFF;"|Big Ten regular season	

					

									

Bold Italic connotes conference game

References

Illinois Fighting Illini
Illinois Fighting Illini men's basketball seasons
1911 in sports in Illinois
1912 in sports in Illinois